Burr Pond State Park is a public recreation area covering  adjacent to Paugnut State Forest in the town of Torrington, Connecticut. It is managed by the Connecticut Department of Energy and Environmental Protection.

History
Burr Pond was created in 1851 when Milo Burr dammed several streams to create a source for power generation. The waterpower was used to operate a tannery and three sawmills. One of Burr's industrial buildings was used from 1857 to 1861 by Gail Borden as his first commercially successful condensed milk factory. The building burned down in 1877; the remains of its stone foundations can be seen off Burr Mountain Road. Signage identifies the spot.

Burr Pond and the area around it were once part of Paugnut State Forest. The acreage was transferred to the State Parks Division and became a state park in 1949.

Activities and amenities
Burr Pond has several small inlets and islands, a rocky shore, and deep drop-offs in several places. Its maximum depth is only . Fish species present include largemouth bass, chain pickerel, black crappie, yellow perch, bluegill, pumpkinseed, and brown bullhead.

The blue-blazed Walcott Trail  loop goes around the pond. The  John Muir Trail across Paugnut State Forest connects the park with Sunnybrook State Park.

A swimming beach, picnic areas, concession stand, and boat rentals are offered seasonally. A trailered boat launch is located at the pond's north end.

References

External links

Burr Pond State Park Connecticut Department of Energy and Environmental Protection
Burr Pond State Park Map Connecticut Department of Energy and Environmental Protection

State parks of Connecticut
Torrington, Connecticut
Parks in Litchfield County, Connecticut
Ponds of Connecticut
Bodies of water of Litchfield County, Connecticut
Protected areas established in 1949
1949 establishments in Connecticut